The 1931 Glasgow St Rollox by-election was held on 7 May 1931 due to the death of the incumbent Labour MP, James Stewart.  It was retained by the Labour candidate William Leonard.

References

Glasgow St Rollox by-election
Glasgow St Rollox by-election
1930s elections in Scotland
1930s in Glasgow
Glasgow St Rollox by-election
St Rollox, 1931